The Long Goodbye may refer to:

Books
The Long Goodbye (novel), a 1953 novel by Raymond Chandler
The Long Goodbye: A Memoir, a 2011 book by Meghan O'Rourke
The Long Good-Bye (Trifonov novel), a 1971 novel by Yury Trifonov
The Long Goodbye (play), a 1940 one-act play by Tennessee Williams

Films
The Long Goodbye (film), a 1973 film by Robert Altman, adapted from the Raymond Chandler novel (see above)
Long Goodbye (film) or The Head Hunter, a 1982 Hong Kong film by Shing Hon Lau

Music
The Long Goodbye (band), an American band featuring Michael Cera
The Long Goodbye (Riz Ahmed album), 2020
The Long Goodbye (The Essex Green album), 2003
The Long Goodbye (Procol Harum album), 1995
Long Goodbye: A Tribute to Don Pullen, a 1998 album by David Murray
The Long Goodbye, an album by John Paul White, 2008
"The Long Goodbye" (song), originally recorded by co-writer Paul Brady, also covered by Brooks & Dunn and by co-writer Ronan Keating
"Long Goodbye" (song), a 1987 song by the Thompson Twins
"The Long Goodbye", a song by Gary Brooker
"The Long Goodbye", a composition by John Williams and Johnny Mercer, for the 1973 film
"The Long Goodbye", a song by Bruce Springsteen from Human Touch
The Long Goodbye: LCD Soundsystem Live at Madison Square Garden, 2014

Television episodes
"The Long Goodbye" (Beverly Hills, 90210)
"The Long Goodbye" (Casualty)
"The Long Goodbye" (Climax!), 1954 television adaptation of the 1953 novel by Raymond Chandler
"The Long Goodbye" (Dallas)
"The Long Goodbye" (Dawson's Creek)
"The Long Goodbye" (Duet)
"The Long Goodbye" (Flying Blind)
"The Long Goodbye" (Full House)
"The Long Goodbye" (Growing Pains)
"The Long Goodbye" (McLeod's Daughters)
"The Long Goodbye" (The Persuaders!)
"The Long Goodbye" (The Rifleman)
"The Long Goodbye" (Stargate Atlantis)
"The Long Goodbye" (The Torkelsons)
"The Long Goodbye" (The West Wing)

See also
Long Farewell, a 2004 Russian drama film
The Long Farewell, a Soviet film drama
The Long Kiss Goodnight, a 1996 American spy action thriller film